Smith Mountain Lake State Park is a  state park along the shores of Smith Mountain Lake in Bedford County, Virginia near Huddleston.  It is primarily a recreational area, offering water-related activities as well as camping, picnicking, hiking facilities, and a public beach.  The park was opened to the public in 1983.

See also
List of Virginia state parks
Smith Mountain Dam for more information on the dam that created Smith Mountain Lake.

References

External links
Virginia Department of Conservation and Recreation: Smith Mountain Lake State Park
Friends of Smith Mountain Lake State Park

State parks of Virginia
Parks in Bedford County, Virginia
Protected areas established in 1983
1983 establishments in Virginia
Beaches of Virginia